Djupedalsleitet Saddle is an ice saddle between the head of Djupedalen Valley and Snuggerud Glacier, south of the Filchner Mountains in Queen Maud Land. It was mapped and name by Norwegian cartographers from surveys and air photos by the Sixth Norwegian Antarctic Expedition (1956–60).

References 

Mountain passes of Queen Maud Land
Princess Astrid Coast